Frankie Wright (born February 1, 1985) is an American athlete who specialises in the 200m and  400m. He was a member of the USA team that won the gold medal in the Men's 4×400 metres relay at the 2012 IAAF World Indoor Championships.

Personal bests

References

External links
 

1985 births
Living people
American male sprinters
World Athletics Indoor Championships winners